KRWR (92.1 FM) is a terrestrial radio station, licensed to Tyler, Texas, United States, owned by Paul Gleiser through licensee ATW Media, LLC, and serving the Tyler-Longview market with a sports format as an affiliate of Fox Sports Radio.

"The Team" studios are co-located with KTBB AM and FM in One American Center at 909 ESE Loop 323, at the intersection with New Copeland Road. The transmitter site is located northeast of downtown Tyler.

History
The 92.1 frequency traces its roots back to 1975 as KROZ ("K-Rose").

During its lifetime, it has aired country music ("Tyler Rose Country"), rock, and urban contemporary music formats (as "Z92.1" while keeping the KROZ calls) and included local personalities such as Hoss Huggins, Dave Mitchell, Alex Price, Joel Hardy, Mike O'Neill, Bill Davis, Paul Berry, and Mick Fulgham.

The station flipped to a 1950s/1960s oldies format and took the KGLD calls on February 9, 1992.  On August 24, 1993, the station changed its call sign to KDOK.

On April 27, 2009, the oldies format was dropped as KDOK became the FM simulcast for sister station 600 KTBB's news/talk format. The call sign was also changed to KTBB-FM to simplify identifications.

On May 7, 2009, the KDOK calls and oldies format were moved to 1240 AM KBGE in Kilgore, Texas.

On February 3, 2015, KTBB-FM was moved to 97.5, accompanied with a call change for 92.1 to the current KRWR, after Paul Gleiser purchased the 97.5 facility from the Rusk Cherokeean Herald newspaper, and relocated the signal to its current Troup licensed site, after over 30 years of service as KWRW in Rusk, Texas. KRWR initially offered nationally syndicated ESPN sports programming, interspersed with local shows and events, branded as "ESPN 92.1 The Team FM". 

In February 2017, KRWR affiliated with Fox Sports Radio, with the revised branding of "92-1 The Team" and airs Tyler Junior College Apache sports, Monday Night Football, and is the East Texas home of the Texas Rangers.

Previous logo
  (KRWR's logo under previous ESPN Radio affiliation)

References

External links

RWR